Isaac Melson Meekins (February 13, 1875 – November 21, 1946) was a United States district judge of the United States District Court for the Eastern District of North Carolina.

Education and career

Born in Tyrrell County, North Carolina, Meekins received an Artium Baccalaureus degree from Wake Forest University in 1896 and entered private practice in Elizabeth City, North Carolina. He was Mayor of Elizabeth City in 1897, and city attorney of Elizabeth City in 1898. He was postmaster of Elizabeth City from 1903 to 1908. He was an Assistant United States Attorney of the Eastern District of North Carolina from 1910 to 1914. He was general counsel for the Alien Property Custodian in Washington, D.C. from 1921 to 1922. He was general counsel and manager for the Enemy Insurance Company in 1922.  

In 1924, Meekins was the unsuccessful Republican nominee for Governor of North Carolina.

Federal judicial service

On January 9, 1925, Meekins was nominated by President Calvin Coolidge to a seat on the United States District Court for the Eastern District of North Carolina vacated by Judge Henry G. Connor. Meekins was confirmed by the United States Senate on January 17, 1925, and received his commission the same day. He assumed senior status on February 13, 1945, serving in that capacity until his death on November 21, 1946.

References

Sources
 

1875 births
1946 deaths
Wake Forest University alumni
Judges of the United States District Court for the Eastern District of North Carolina
United States district court judges appointed by Calvin Coolidge
20th-century American judges
Assistant United States Attorneys
People from Tyrrell County, North Carolina
Mayors of places in North Carolina
People from Elizabeth City, North Carolina
North Carolina lawyers
North Carolina postmasters